Eduardo Felipe Bellini Ferrer (born 13 May 1966) is a Spanish windsurfer. He competed in the Windglider event at the 1984 Summer Olympics.

Notes

References

External links
 
 

1966 births
Living people
Spanish windsurfers
Spanish male sailors (sport)
Olympic sailors of Spain
Sailors at the 1984 Summer Olympics – Windglider
Sportspeople from Mallorca